Japanese currency has a history covering the period from the 8th century AD to the present. After the traditional usage of rice as a currency medium, Japan adopted currency systems and designs from China before developing a separate system of its own.

History

Commodity money 

Before the 7th-8th centuries AD, Japan used commodity money for trading. This generally consisted of material that was compact and easily transportable and had a widely recognized value. Commodity money was a great improvement over simple barter, in which commodities were simply exchanged against others. Ideally, commodity money had to be widely accepted, easily portable and storable, and easily combined and divided in order to correspond to different values. The main items of commodity money in Japan were arrowheads, rice grains and gold powder.

This contrasted somewhat with countries like China, where one of the most important items of commodity money came from the southern seas: shells. Since then however, the shell has become a symbol for money in many Chinese and Japanese ideograms.

Early coinage 

The earliest coins to reach Japan were Chinese Ban Liang and Wu Zhu coins, as well as the coins produced by Wang Mang during the first centuries of the first millennium AD; these coins have been excavated all over Japan, but as Japan's economy was not sufficiently developed at the time, these coins were more likely to be used as precious objects rather than a means of exchange; rice and cloth served as the main currencies of Japan at the time.

These currencies (alongside other reforms) were based on the Chinese system and were therefore based on the Chinese units of measurement. In modern times the usage of Fuhonsen has often been interpreted as charms rather than currency, but it has recently been discovered that these copper coins were in fact the first government-made coinage of Japan.

Kōchōsen currency system (8th–10th centuries)

Embassy to the Tang court (630 AD) 
Japan's first formal currency system was the Kōchōsen (Japanese: 皇朝銭, "Imperial currency"). It was exemplified by the adoption of Japan's first official coin type, the Wadōkaichin. It was first minted in 708 AD on the orders of Empress Genmei, Japan's 43rd Imperial ruler. "Wadō Kaichin" is the reading of the four characters printed on the coin, and is thought to be composed of the era name Wadō (和銅, "Japanese copper"), which could alternatively mean "happiness", and "Kaichin", thought to be related to "currency". 

This coinage was inspired by the Tang coinage (唐銭) named Kaigen Tsūhō (Chinese: 開元通宝, Kai Yuan Tong Bao), first minted in Chang'an in 621 CE. The Wadokaichin had the same specifications as the Chinese coin, with a diameter of 2.4 cm and a weight of 3.75g.
Japan's contacts with the Chinese mainland became intense during the Tang period, with many exchanges and cultural imports occurring. The first Japanese embassy to China is recorded to have been sent in 630. The importance of metallic currency appeared to Japanese nobles, probably leading to some coin minting at the end of the 7th century, such as the  coinage (富本銭), discovered in 1998 through archaeological research in Nara Prefecture. An entry of the Nihon Shoki dated April 15, 683 mentions: "From now on, copper coins should be used, but silver coins should not be used", which is thought to order the adoption of the Fuhonsen copper coins. The first official coinage was struck in 708.

Currency reform (760) 
The Wadōkaichin soon became debased, as the government rapidly issued coins with progressively lesser metallic content, and local imitations thrived. In 760, a reform was put in place, in which a new copper coin called  (萬年通寳) was worth 10 times the value of the former Wadōkaichin, with also a new silver coin named  (大平元寶) with a value of 10 copper coins, as well as a new gold coin named  (開基勝寶) with a value of 10 silver coins.

Silver minting was soon abandoned however, but copper minting took place throughout the Nara period. A variety of coin types are known, altogether 12 types, including one coin type in gold.

Last issues (958) 
The Kōchōsen Japanese system of coinage became strongly debased, with its metallic content and value decreasing. By the middle of the 9th century, the value of a coin in rice had fallen to 1/150th of its value of the early 8th century.

By the end of the 10th century, compounded with weaknesses in the political system, this led to the abandonment of the national currency, with the return to rice as a currency medium. The last official Japanese coin issue was in 958, with very low quality coins called  (乹元大寶), which soon fell into disuse.

The last Kōchōsen coins produced after the Wadōkaichin include:

Chinese coinage (12th–17th centuries)

Importation of Chinese coinage 

From the 12th century, the expansion of trade and barter again highlighted the need for a currency. Chinese coinage came to be used as the standard currency of Japan, for a period lasting from the 12th to the 17th century. Coins were obtained from China through trade or through "Wakō" piracy. Coins were also imported from Annam (modern Vietnam) and Korea.

There is evidence to suggest that the Yuan dynasty used to extensively export Chinese cash coins to Japan for local circulation. The Sinan shipwreck, which was a ship from Ningbo to Hakata that sank off the Korean coast in the year 1323, carried some 8,000 strings of cash coins, which weighed about 26,775 kg.

Imitations of Chinese coinage 
As the Chinese coins were not in sufficient number as trade and economy expanded, local Japanese imitations of Chinese coins were made from the 14th century, especially imitations of Ming coins, with inscribed names identical to those of contemporary Chinese coins. These coins had a very low value compared to Chinese coins, and several of them had to be exchanged for just one Chinese coin. This situation continued until the beginning of the Edo period, when a new system was put in place.

Local experiments (16th century) 
The growth of the economy and trade meant that small copper currency became insufficient to cover the amounts that were being exchanged. During the Sengoku period, the characteristics of the future Edo Period system began to emerge. Local Lords developed trade, abolishing monopolistic guilds, which led to the need for large-denomination currencies. From the 16th century, local experiments started to be made, with the minting of local coins, sometimes in gold. Especially the Takeda clan of Kōshū minted gold coins which were later adopted by the Tokugawa shogunate.

Hideyoshi unified Japan, and thus centralized most of the minting of large denomination silver and gold coins, effectively putting in place the basis of a unified currency system. Hideyoshi developed the large Ōban plate, also called the Tenshō Ōban (天正大判), in 1588, a predecessor to Tokugawa gold coinage.

A common practice in that period was to melt gold into copper molds for convenience, derived from the sycee manufacturing method. These were called Bundōkin (分銅金), of which there were two types, the small Kobundō (小分銅), and the large Ōbundō (大分銅). A Kobundō would represent about 373g in gold.

Tokugawa currency (17th–19th centuries) 

Tokugawa coinage was a unitary and independent metallic monetary system established by shōgun Tokugawa Ieyasu in 1601 in Japan, and which lasted throughout the Tokugawa period until its end in 1867.

From 1601, Tokugawa coinage consisted of gold, silver, and bronze denominations. The denominations were fixed, but the rates actually fluctuated on the exchange market. Tokugawa started by minting Keicho gold and silver coins, and Chinese copper coins were later replaced by Kan'ei Tsuho coins in 1670.

The material for the coinage came from gold and silver mines across Japan. For this purpose, new gold mines were opened, such as the Sado and Toi gold mines in the Izu Peninsula. Regarding diamond coins, the Kan'ei Tsūhō coin (寛永通宝) came to replace the Chinese coins that had been in circulation in Japan, as well as those that were privately minted, and became the legal tender for small denominations.

Yamada Hagaki, Japan's first notes, were issued around 1600 by Shinto priests also working as merchants in the Ise-Yamada (modern Mie Prefecture), in exchange for silver. This was earlier than the first goldsmith notes issued in England around 1640. The first known feudal note was issued by the Fukui clan in 1661. During the 17th century, the feudal domains developed a system of feudal notes, giving currency to pledged notes issued by the lord of the domain, in exchange for convertibility to gold, silver or copper. Japan thus combined gold, silver, and copper standards with the circulation of paper money.

Tokugawa coinage remained in use during the Sakoku period of seclusion, although it was progressively debased to try to manage government deficits. The first debasement, in 1695, was called the Genroku Recoinage.

Bakumatsu currency (1854–1868) 

The Tokugawa coinage collapsed following the reopening of Japan to the West in 1854, as the silver-gold exchange rates gave foreigners huge opportunities for arbitrage, leading to the export of large quantities of gold. Gold traded for silver in Japan at a 1:5 ratio, while that ratio was 1:15 abroad. During the Bakumatsu period in 1859 Mexican dollars were even given official currency in Japan, by coining them with marks in Japanese and officializing their exchange rate of three "Bu". They were called Aratame Sanbu Sadame (改三分定, "Fixed to the value of three bu").

Meanwhile, local governments issued their own currency chaotically, so that the nation's money supply expanded by 2.5 times between 1859 and 1869, leading to crumbling money values and soaring prices. The system was replaced by a new one after the conclusion of the Boshin War, and with the onset of the Meiji government in 1868.

Imperial Japan (1871–present) 
Following 1868, a new currency system based on the Japanese yen was progressively established along Western lines, which has remained Japan's currency system to this day.

Immediately after the Meiji Restoration in 1868, previous gold, silver and copper coins, as well as feudal notes, continued to circulate, leading to great confusion. In 1868, the government also issued coins and gold-convertible paper money, called Daijōkansatsu (太政官札), denominated in Ryō, an old unit from the Edo period, and private banks called Kawase Kaisha were allowed to issue their own currency as well. Complexity, widespread counterfeiting of gold coins and feudal notes led to widespread confusion.

Birth of the yen: New Currency Act (1871) 

Through the New Currency Act of 1871, Japan adopted the gold standard along international lines, with 1 yen corresponding to 1.5g of pure gold. The Meiji government issued new notes, called Meiji Tsūhōsatsu (明治通宝札), in 1872, which were printed in Germany.

Silver coins were also issued for trade with Asian countries who favoured silver as a currency, thus establishing a de facto gold-silver standard.

National Bank Act (1872) 
The National Bank Act of 1872 led to the establishment of four banks between 1873 and 1874, and there were more than 153 national banks by the end of 1879. The national banks issued identically designed convertible notes, which were effective in funding industry and progressively replaced government notes. In 1876, an amendment allowed the banks to make the banknotes virtually non-convertible. These national banknotes imitated the design of American banknotes, although the name of the issuer was different for each.

Severe inflation broke out with the Seinan Civil War in 1877. This was controlled by the reduction of government spending and the removal of paper currency from circulation. During the Seinan Civil War, an original type of paper money was issued by the rebel leader Saigō Takamori in order to finance his war effort.

In 1881, the first Japanese note to feature a portrait, the Empress Jingū note (神功皇后札), was issued.

Bank of Japan (1882) 
In order to regularize the issuance of convertible banknotes, a central bank, the Bank of Japan, was established in 1882. The bank would stabilize the currency by centralizing the issuance of convertible banknotes. The first central banknotes were issued by the Bank of Japan in 1885. They were called Daikokusatsu (大黒札), and were convertible in silver.

Following the devaluation of silver, and the abandonment of silver as a currency standard by Western powers, Japan adopted the gold standard through the Coinage Law of 1897. The yen was fixed at 0.75g of pure gold, and banknotes were issued which were convertible into gold. In 1899, the National Banks banknotes were declared invalid, leaving the Bank of Japan as the only supplier of currency.

World Wars 
During World War I, Japan prohibited the export of gold in 1917, as did many countries such as the United States. Gold convertibility was again shortly established in January 1930, only to be abandoned in 1931 when Great Britain abandoned the gold standard. Conversion of banknotes into gold was suspended.

From 1941, Japan formally adopted a managed currency system, and in 1942 the Bank of Japan Law officially suppressed the obligation of conversion.

Modern yen

In 1946, following the Second World War, Japan removed the old currency (旧円券) and introduced the "New Yen" (新円券). Meanwhile, American occupation forces used a parallel system, called B yen, from 1945 to 1958.

Since then, together with the economic expansion of Japan, the yen has become one of the major currencies of the world.

See also

 Coinage of Asia
 History of Chinese currency

Citations

Further reading 

Early Japanese Coins. David Hartill.

External links 
 Timeline of Japanese coins by the government-owned Japan Mint

Economic history of Japan
Currencies of Asia